Joseph Edward Corvo (born June 20, 1977) is an American former professional ice hockey player who played 11 seasons in the National Hockey League (NHL) for the Los Angeles Kings, Ottawa Senators, Carolina Hurricanes, Washington Capitals, and Boston Bruins.

Playing career

Early career
In one of Corvo's first major ice hockey appearances, he participated in the 1997 World Junior Championships in Switzerland. Despite placing second to Canada in the medal round, he was named the top defenseman of the tournament. He then played for three seasons at Western Michigan University, from 1995 to 1998, where he was a teammate of future NHL player Jamal Mayers.

Professional career

Los Angeles Kings
He was drafted by the Los Angeles Kings in the 4th round of the 1997 NHL Entry Draft. He made his NHL debut in the 2002–03 season. He would play three seasons for the Kings. His best season with the Kings saw him score fourteen goals and 26 assists for 40 points in 2005–06.

Ottawa Senators
On July 1, 2006, Corvo signed as a four-year, unrestricted free agent contract with the Ottawa Senators worth $10.5 million. On October 26, 2006, he broke a Senators record for points for a defenseman in a game with one goal and four assists against the Toronto Maple Leafs. He was named the game's first star. That season, the Senators made it to the Stanley Cup Final, losing to the Anaheim Ducks in five games.

Carolina Hurricanes
In a trade to prepare the Senators for the 2008 playoffs, the Senators traded Corvo along with Patrick Eaves to the Carolina Hurricanes for Mike Commodore and Cory Stillman in February 2008. On March 16, 2008, Corvo scored a  hat trick against the Senators in his first game against his ex-team since the trade. After the game, Ottawa GM was quoted as saying he would never have traded Corvo "if he played like that with Ottawa." Corvo became only the third defenseman in Hartford Whalers-Carolina Hurricanes franchise history to record a hat trick. Between the Senators and Hurricanes, Corvo scored 13 goals and 35 assists totaling 48 points for the season.

Washington Capitals
Corvo would play for nearly two seasons with the Hurricanes until March 3, 2010, when he was traded to Washington at the deadline for Brian Pothier, Oskar Osala, and a second-round draft pick in the 2011 NHL Entry Draft. Corvo made his Capitals debut against the Tampa Bay Lightning the following day on March 4, and finished the season with two goals for six points in 18 games with the Capitals before suffering a first round elimination in the playoffs to the Montreal Canadiens.

Return to Carolina, Boston Bruins
Corvo returned to the Hurricanes as a free agent on July 7, 2010. Corvo signed a two-year contract to return to the Carolina Hurricanes worth $2.75 million a year. Corvo played most of two seasons before being traded to the Boston Bruins on July 5, 2011, for a fourth-round pick in the 2012 NHL Entry Draft. After one season with the Bruins, Corvo returned for a third stint with Hurricanes, signing a one-year $2 million deal on July 1, 2012. He scored six goals and eleven assists in the shortened 48-game season as the Hurricanes missed the playoffs.

Return to Ottawa
After one season with the Hurricanes, Corvo returned to the Ottawa Senators as a free agent, signing a one-year deal for $900,000 per season on July 8, 2013. On March 5, 2014, Corvo was loaned to the Chicago Wolves after clearing NHL waivers.

Restaurant incident
Corvo was arrested in November 2002 in Boston after he grabbed a 34-year-old woman's buttocks in a restaurant. Restaurant staff told him to leave, but Corvo returned, punched the woman and then kicked her when she fell to the ground, police said. Corvo was given a three-year suspended sentence after he pleaded guilty to assault. Corvo was also suspended for three games by the Kings.

Career statistics

Regular season and playoffs

International

Awards and honors

References

External links

1977 births
American men's ice hockey defensemen
Boston Bruins players
Carolina Hurricanes players
Chicago Wolves players
Hampton Roads Admirals players
Ice hockey players from Illinois
Living people
Los Angeles Kings draft picks
Los Angeles Kings players
Lowell Lock Monsters players
Manchester Monarchs (AHL) players
Ottawa Senators players
Sportspeople from Oak Park, Illinois
Springfield Falcons players
Washington Capitals players
Western Michigan Broncos men's ice hockey players